The 170th Infantry Brigade was an infantry formation of the United States Army. From 2009 to 2012, as part of its third period of existence, it was based at Baumholder in the Federal Republic of Germany.

World War I
The 170th Infantry Brigade was first activated 25 August 1917 at Camp Custer, Michigan.  Commanded initially by Julius Penn, it was one of two brigades of the 85th Infantry Division, National Army.
  Headquarters, 170th Brigade
  339th Infantry Regiment
  340th Infantry Regiment
  330th Machine Gun Battalion
After a year of training the division left the U.S. for England. When the American Expeditionary Force North Russia was formed to be sent to Arkhangelsk, Russia, the 339th Infantry Regiment provided the infantry component, with support units also taken from the 85th Division sent along as well. While there, the 339th saw combat against the Bolsheviks. The 340th Infantry Regiment and the remainder of the Brigade was stationed in Lorraine, on the Western Front in France where the 85th served as a depot division and did not participate in any combat operations.

World War Two
The brigade, along with its parent unit the 85th Infantry Division, was reestablished as part of the Organized Reserves in 1921. However, the 85th Infantry Division was reactivated on 15 May 1942, it was as a triangular division with direct control of the 337th, 338th, and 339th Infantry Regiments. Thus the brigade was converted to serve as the 85th Reconnaissance Troop and served as the eyes and ears of the 85th Infantry Division throughout World War Two.

Interwar to 1970
With the reestablishment of brigades in the TOE of divisions in the 1960s following the short-lived experiment with pentomic organization, the 2nd Brigade, 24th Infantry Division was in 1963 assigned the heritage of the 170th Infantry Brigade. The 24th Division was inactivated in 1970, then reactivated from 1975 to 1996. When the 24th was reactivated again in 1999 it was as a headquarters unit only with separate National Guard brigades attached and no organic brigades of its own. It was inactivated again on 1 August 2006.

From 2009-2012
The 170th Infantry Brigade of the United States Army was reestablished 15 July 2009 at U.S. Army Garrison Baumholder in Germany as part of the Grow the Army Plan. The 170th Infantry Brigade was formed by reflagging the 2nd Brigade, 1st Armored Division. The soldiers and equipment will remain in place but the 2d Brigade flag will transfer to Ft. Bliss, Texas, joining other elements of the 1st Armored Division. The 170th Infantry Brigade is organized as an enlarged hybrid of the Army XXI Heavy Division Infantry Brigade and modular brigade designs, as it incorporates both organic artillery and engineer battalions together with three infantry and armor units.

Afghanistan
In late 2010 part of the unit deployed to Northern Afghanistan (RC-N)to take part in a NATO training mission in conjunction with the ANA and ANP.

In early 2011, the 170th IBCT deployed in support of Operation Enduring Freedom 11–12 to Regional Command North. During the brigade's deployment, it partnered with the 303rd Afghan Uniformed Police and the Afghan Border Police's 5th Zone. Key highlights of the deployment include the handover of security responsibilities for Mazar E Sharif from the International Security Assistance Force to the Government of the Islamic Republic of Afghanistan by the Germans. The brigade also deployed two of its battalions for separate missions in support of other regional commands. The 3d Battalion, 4th Infantry Regiment deployed in November 2010 to Regional Command Capital where it initially assumed part of the NTMA training mission in and around Kabul. It later transitioned to a security force mission across Afghanistan, ensuring various NTMA elements and VIPs were able to accomplish their tasks in a secure environment. The brigade's 4th Battalion, 70th Armor Regiment deployed to Regional Command South where it operated under Combined Team Uruzgan, partnered with the Australian Army. The brigade is redeployed back to Baumholder, Germany in early 2012. A total of eight brigade soldiers died during the deployment.

The 170th Infantry Brigade included the following subordinate units in 2011:

 Headquarters and Headquarters Company, 170th Infantry Brigade
  Troop D, 5th Cavalry Regiment
  4th Battalion, 70th Armor Regiment
  2nd Battalion, 18th Infantry Regiment
  3rd Battalion, 4th Infantry Regiment
  1st Battalion, 84th Field Artillery Regiment
  40th Engineer Battalion (in addition to engineer companies, also controls the below units)
 589th Signal Company
 502nd Military Intelligence Company
 2nd Platoon, 501st Military Police Company
 23d Military Police Platoon
 24th Brigade Support Battalion
In February 2012, Military.com announced that the brigade would be inactivated by the summer of 2012. Over the course of the year, 4,000 of the brigade's 4,500 soldiers were reassigned. On 9 October 2012, the 170th Infantry Brigade was inactivated in Germany, with the remaining 500 soldiers present for the event.

References

External links
 Brigade Website https://web.archive.org/web/20101003065725/http://www.170infantry.army.mil/
Mark St.Clair, and John Vandiver, Name changes set for 2 Germany-based units, Stars and Stripes, Friday, 7 March 2008
Stars and Stripes "1st AD brigade gets new colors"

170
United States military in Germany
Military units and formations established in 1917
Military units and formations disestablished in 2012